Northwestern Bank was a community bank based in Traverse City, Michigan that served northern Michigan. In 2014, it was acquired by Chemical Financial Corporation.

History
The bank was established in 1955.

In September 2012, the bank entered into a consent order with the Federal Deposit Insurance Corporation (FDIC) to address concerns about oversight and lending controls.

In January 2013, Harry “Scrub” Calcutt, the chief executive officer of the bank, retired. He was replaced by Daniel W. Terpsma.

In August 2013, the FDIC banned Calcutt from the banking industry after he allegedly hid loan defaults.

On October 31, 2014, the bank was acquired by Chemical Financial Corporation for $121 million in cash.

References

Banks established in 1955
Defunct banks of the United States
1955 establishments in Michigan
2014 mergers and acquisitions